Jessica Wesson (born January 1, 1982) is a retired American actress. She is best known for her recurring role as Jennifer Sudarsky, Brad's (Zachery Ty Bryan) first girlfriend on the sitcom Home Improvement, and having supporting roles in the Universal films Casper and Flipper in the 1990s.

In 1993 and 1997, Wesson was nominated for a Young Artist Award for Home Improvement and Flipper. She also co-starred in the film Milk Money (1994).

Wesson also guest starred in the television series Baywatch, Boy Meets World and Odd Man Out. In 2001, she had a recurring role as Katie Albright on Judging Amy. Her last acting credit was a role in the 2001 film Longshot.

Filmography

References

External links

1982 births
Living people
20th-century American actresses
21st-century American actresses
American child actresses
American film actresses
American television actresses
Place of birth missing (living people)